Irina Petrovna Miroshnichenko (born 24 July 1942) is a Soviet and Russian film and theatre actress. People's Artist of the RSFSR (1988).

Selected filmography
1964 – Walking the Streets of Moscow as Katya
1966 – Andrei Rublev as Mary Magdalene
1970 – Uncle Vanya as Yelena Serebryakova
1970 – Mission in Kabul as Marina Arkadyevna Luzhina
1973 – That Sweet Word: Liberty! as Maria
1976 – Trust as Maria Andreeva
1981 – Could One Imagine? as Lyudmila Sergeevna
1981 – The Old New Year as Klava Poluorlova

References

External links

1942 births
Living people
People from Barnaul
Soviet film actresses
Soviet stage actresses
Soviet television actresses
Russian film actresses
Russian stage actresses
Russian television actresses
20th-century Russian actresses
21st-century Russian actresses
Recipients of the Order of Honour (Russia)
People's Artists of the RSFSR
Honored Artists of the RSFSR
Moscow Art Theatre School alumni